Irom Seityasen Singh (born 12 March 1992) is an Indian professional footballer who plays as a winger.

Club career

Royal Wahingdoh
On 19 September 2011 Seityasen made his professional debut in the Federation Cup against Churchill Brothers for Royal Wahingdoh who were then in the I-League 2nd Division. The Royals created a major upset beating their fancied rivals 2–1 with Seityasen captaining Wahingdoh, and scoring the first goal. He was then an important part of Wahingdoh's 2011 I-League 2nd Division squad where they qualified for the final round but failed to qualify to the I-League in the final round. He then participated in the 2012 I-League 2nd Division for Wahingdoh, where he scored twice in the group stages thus helping his team qualify to the 2012 I-League 2nd Division Final Round again. In the final round, it is only known that Seityasen appeared 8 times scoring thrice, but could not help his side gain promotion. In the 2013 I-League 2nd Division, he scored thrice but could not help his team qualify for the final round in a disappointing season. Finally, during the 2014 I-League 2nd Division, he scored three times to help his team qualify for the I-League.

Seityasen played his first game of the new season in the Federation Cup against Mumbai in a 2–1 win. He would then make his I-League debut against Shillong Lajong and scored his first goal of the 2014-15 season from a Jackichand Singh assist in a match they won by 2-1 scoreline. On 27 January 2015, he scored the winner against Bharat FC in the 64th minute to give his side third win in a row. The young winger scored his first hat-trick in the I-League on 3 May 2015, when he netted thrice against Salgaocar F.C. in a match played in Shillong. Royal Wahingdoh won the tie 4–2.

NorthEast United (loan)
In July 2015, Seityasen Singh was auctioned to play for NorthEast United in the 2015 Indian Super League. Representing NorthEast United in the 2015 Indian Super League campaign, he was one of the 10 Indian players who were part of the auction. He picked up 4 Emerging Player of The Match Awards and received another National Team call-up for his excellent performances.

Salgaocar
On 7 January 2016, Salgaocar confirmed that they have signed Royal Wahingdoh's star winger Seityasen Singh for 1 year. On 24 January, Seityasen made his league debut, coming-on as 38th-minute substitute for Alesh Sawant in an away match against Mumbai FC at the Cooperage Stadium.

DSK Shivajians
On 1 January 2017, DSK Shivajians confirmed that they have signed NorthEast United's star winger Seityasen Singh sign for DSK Shivajians (loan).

NorthEast United
On June 30, 2017, NorthEast retained Seityasen for third season of Hero ISL from end of loan from DSK Shivajians.

Delhi Dynamos
On 23 July 2017, Delhi Dynamos FC confirmed that they have signed NorthEast United's star winger Seityasen Singh.

NorthEast United
On 1 July 2018, NorthEast United confirmed that they have signed Delhi Dynamos's winger Seityasen Singh.

Kerala Blasters FC
On 17 August 2019, Kerala Blasters confirmed that they have signed Seityasen Singh on a one-year deal. He made 10 appearances during the 2019-20 season of Indian Super League and scored his first goal for the club against Hyderabad FC.

In September 2020, it was confirmed that Seityasen has extended his contract with the Blasters till 2022.

Seityasen was included in the Kerala Blasters squad for the 2021 Durand Cup, where he appeared in all three matches for the club throughout the tournament. He played his first match of the 2021–22 Indian Super League season against defending champions Mumbai City FC on 19 November 2021 as a substitute for Álvaro Vázquez in the 83rd minute of the game which they won 0–3 at full-time.

Hyderabad FC (loan) 
On 29 December, Kerala Blasters announced the loan departure of Seityasen to Hyderabad FC for the rest of the season.

International career
On 11 June 2015, Singh made his debut for the India national football team in the 2018 FIFA World Cup Qualifier against Oman.

Career statistics

Club
As of matches played till 30 March 2022

International

References

Indian footballers
1992 births
Living people
Footballers from Manipur
Royal Wahingdoh FC players
I-League 2nd Division players
I-League players
Salgaocar FC players
Indian Super League players
NorthEast United FC players
Association football wingers
Kerala Blasters FC players
Odisha FC players
India international footballers
DSK Shivajians FC players
Hyderabad FC players